Roscoe Conklin "Rock" Cartwright (May 27, 1919 – December 1, 1974) was the United States' second-ever African American U.S. Army brigadier general, third-ever African American U.S. general officer, and the first black field artilleryman promoted to brigadier general.

Early life, education and personal life
Cartwright was born in Kansas City, Kansas, on May 27, 1919. Raised in Tulsa, Oklahoma, Cartwright graduated from Booker T. Washington High School in 1936. He attended Kansas State Teachers College at Emporia, Kansas. Unable to afford his tuition at Kansas State, Cartwright ended his studies and worked at the University of Tulsa and the Bubble Up Bottling Company. In June 1960, Cartwright graduated from San Francisco State College with a BA Degree in Social Science. He also earned an MBA from the University of Missouri.

Cartwright was a 1974 initiate of Alpha Phi Alpha fraternity, a traditionally African-American college fraternity.

While temporarily stationed at Camp Robinson near Little Rock, Arkansas, Cartwright married Gloria Lacefied Cartwright, a native of Hope, Arkansas.  They had four children, eight grandchildren and three great-grandchildren.

Military career

In 1941, the U.S. Army drafted Cartwright into the US Army as an enlisted man. The segregated US Army assigned him to the all-African American enlisted men 349th Field Artillery Regiment at Fort Sill, Oklahoma. The unit's officer were all white except the chaplain, an African American man.

In November 1942, Cartwright graduated from Officers Candidate School, receiving a commission as a Field Artillery Second Lieutenant in the 599th Field Artillery Battalion of the all-African American brigade of the 92nd Infantry Division, best known as the Buffalo Soldiers Serving primarily in Italy, Cartwright remained with the 599th throughout the remainder of World War II. After the war he was promoted to first lieutenant.

For three years, Cartwright taught Reserve Officer Training Corps (ROTC).

As a captain, Cartwright served in Japan and Korea. In 1954 he was transferred from a segregated unit into the "regular" integrated army as a major. He served in South Vietnam until 1971, when he became the third African American after General Benjamin O. Davis Sr and General Benjamin O. Davis Jr to be promoted to brigadier general.

After working at the Pentagon, Cartwright retired from the military in 1974. He had served in the U.S. military for 33 years.

Major assignments
 November 1963-August 1966: Comptroller, U.S. Army Garrison, Fort Leavenworth, KS.
 August 1966-July 1968: Management Analyst, later Chief, Management Planning Division, later Chief, Research and Development Division, Office of the Director of Management, Office, Comptroller of the Army, Washington, DC.
 August 1968-June 1969: Student, Industrial College of the Armed Forces, Fort Lesley J. McNair, Washington, DC.
 August 1969-January 1970: Commanding Officer, 108th Artillery Group, U.S. Army Pacific – Vietnam.
 February–July 1970: Deputy Commanding Officer, U.S. Army Support Command, Cam Ranh Bay U.S. Army, Pacific – Vietnam.
 August 1970-July 1971: Chief, Budget and Five Year Defense Program, Coordination Division, Manpower and Forces Directorate, Officer of the Assistant Chief of Staff for Force Development, U.S. Army, Washington, DC.
 July–November 1971: Special Assistant to the Assistant Chief of Staff for Force Development, U.S. Army, Washington, DC.
 November 1971-February 1972: Director of Management, Review and Analysis, Officer, Comptroller of the Army, Washington, DC.
 February 1972-July 1973: Assistant Division Command, 3rd Infantry Division, U.S. Army, Europe.
 August 1973-August 1974: Deputy Chief of Staff, Comptroller, U.S. Army, Europe and Seventh Army

Medals and awards
 Two (2) Legion of Merit
 Three (3) Bronze Stars 
 Meritorious Service Medal
 Three (3) Air Medal
 Three (3) Army Commendation Medal

Military schools

 The Artillery School, School, Advanced Course
 United States Army Command and General Staff College
 Industrial College of the Armed Forces

Death in TWA Flight 514 crash
All 92 people aboard (85 passengers and 7 crew members) were killed. Cartwright's flight was the worst air disaster of 1974. Cartwright and Gloria were returning from visiting their daughter for Thanksgiving. Cartwright was 55 years old; Gloria was 49 years old.

Cartwright and his wife Gloria were buried at Arlington National Cemetery.

Legacy
 In 1992, West Virginia State College posthumously inducted Cartwright into its ROTC Hall of Fame.
 With Colonel Robert B. Burke, Cartwright co-founded on October 9, 1974 The Rocks, Inc., the largest professional military officers organization with a majority African-American membership. The organization has been essential in the development of black military officers including member Colin Powell, as discussed in his autobiography.
 The Roscoe C. Cartwright Prince Hall Masonic Lodge #129 in Oxon Hill, Maryland is named for Cartwright.

References 

1919 births
1974 deaths
United States Army generals
United States Army personnel of World War II
United States Army personnel of the Korean War
United States Army personnel of the Vietnam War
Emporia State University alumni
San Francisco State University alumni
Victims of aviation accidents or incidents in 1974
Burials at Arlington National Cemetery